Justika Sjarifuddin Baharsjah (born 7 May 1937) is an Indonesian activist, teacher and former minister. She has served as Minister of Agriculture in the Seventh Development Cabinet, and Minister of Social Affairs in the Development Reform Cabinet. Her husband, Sjarifuddin Baharsjah, was her predecessor as the Minister of Agriculture.

Justika is also known as an academic who teaches at the IPB University. Justika is active in several organizations, including as the General Chair of the Association of Agricultural Meteorologists and Independent Chairman (Chair of the Supervisory Agency) at the Food and Agriculture Organization (FAO).

In 2020, she appeared on the Haryono Show.

References 

1937 births
Living people
Indonesian activists
Indonesian politicians